Udala is a town and headquarter of Kaptipada subdivision of Mayurbhanj district, Odisha. It is also a NAC of Mayurbhanj district.

Geography

It has an average elevation of 57 metres (187 feet). The place is situated about 45 km from Baripada the district headquarters of Mayurbhanj. This is situated near the great waterfalls of Similipal.

Demographics
 India census, Udala had a population of 11,712. Males constituted 52% of the population and females 48%. According to the government's website it now has a population of 41,974,218. Udala has an average literacy rate of 74%, higher than the national average of 59.5%: male literacy is 79%, and female literacy is 69%. In Udala, 11% of the population is under six years of age. Under this block, many panchayats are there. Among them, the largest panchayat is Bahubandh Grama panchayat.

Places of interest
 
Devkund: Devkund is a scenic spot, found at a distance of 65 km from Baripada and 110 km from Balasore. This place is a tourist attraction, owing to its waterfalls and natural environment. Perched on a hill, Maa Ambika Temple is a shrine of Devkund.

Samibrukhya: Samibrukhya is a single vertical stone which is also a major tourist attraction. The size of the vertical stone is around 500ft. It is the place where Pandavas kept their weapons during their exile according to Mahabharata. A big festival is organised during Makara Sankranti.

Jhinkeswar Temple: Jhinkeswar temple is an abode of Lord Shiva. It is a place for the Udbhaba Linga (where the linga has appeared from the ground), so the sanctum of the temple is below the ground level. There is a small pond attached to the temple and an old and deep well located in the premise of the temple. Jhinkeswar Shiva temple was built by  Sadashiva Kar many years ago. Every year on Shivaratri the Jagara Yatra is conducted in the village jhinkpada. Merchants from far away places gather here to sell their commodities. This Yatra is conducted for about 15 days.

Mouda Temple: Mouda temple is a Shiva temple located on the top of the Mouda hill located near Radho. Every year on Shivaratri the hill is decorated with lights and offerings are made to Lord Shiva by the people.

Tarini Temple: This Tarini temple is located atop a small hilltop in Udala.

Kalo and Sunei: These are irrigation project dams and located in Kaptipada. These are popular places for picnicking and boating. Currently boating facilities available only in Kalo dam.

Politics
There are 12 wards in Udala towns. The main villages under Udala are Mendhakhai and Nagpal; the other places are Bandhasahi, Jyoti nagar, Jantrida, Subudhiband, Collegeroad, Nagbani, Lodha colony, and Kalia Chhak. The current member of the legislative assembly (MLA) from Udala (ST) Assembly Constituency is Bhaskar Madhei of BJP. He won election in 2004 and 2000. The previous MLA from this seat was Srinath Soren of BJD, who won the seat in state elections in 2014. Rabaneswar Madhei who won this seat represented INC in 1995 and 1985 and represented INC(I) in 1980, Rohidas Soren of JD in 1990, and Birbhadra Singh of JNP in 1977.

Udala is part of Mayurbhanj (Lok Sabha constituency).

Famous people 

Tattwa Prakash Satapathy, an Odia actor, music director, and standup comedian born in Nuasahi village of Kaptipada.

References

External links
 : Samibrukhya Hill
 http://jhinkeswartemplembj.webs.com

Cities and towns in Mayurbhanj district